Narej Karpkraikaew (born September 1, 1983) is a retired professional footballer from Thailand.

References

1983 births
Living people
Narej Karpkraikaew
Narej Karpkraikaew
Association football forwards
Narej Karpkraikaew
Narej Karpkraikaew
Narej Karpkraikaew
Narej Karpkraikaew
Narej Karpkraikaew